Meetup is a social media platform for hosting and organizing in-person and virtual activities, gatherings, and events for people and communities of similar interests, hobbies, and professions. It was founded in 2002 by Scott Heiferman and four others. The company was acquired by WeWork in 2017 and remains headquartered in New York City. WeWork sold it to AlleyCorp, an early stage NY-focused venture fund and incubator, in March 2020.

History
Meetup was founded in June 2002 by Scott Heiferman and four co-founders. The idea for Meetup came from Heiferman meeting his neighbors in New York City for the first time after the September 11 attacks on the Twin Towers. Heiferman was also influenced by the book Bowling Alone, which is about the deterioration of community in American culture. Some initial funding for the venture was raised from friends and family, which was followed by a funding round with angel investors.

The early version of Meetup generated revenues by charging a fee to venues in exchange for bringing Meetup users to their business. Once enough users added themselves to a group, Meetup would send the group members an email, asking them to vote on one of three sponsoring venues for the group to meet at. Within a few months of Meetup launching, 56,000 users had joined the site. In 2003 Meetup won the "Community Websites and Mobile Site" Webby Award.

Meetup was originally intended to focus on hobbies and interests, but it was popularized by Presidential hopeful Howard Dean in 2004. Meetup developed paid services to help the Dean campaign to meet with Meetup users. Dean also publicized Meetup groups of supporters in his speeches and on his website. At the peak of Dean's campaign, 143,000 users had joined Meetup groups for Dean supporters. Afterwards, Meetup became a routine part of internet campaigning for American politicians.

Meetup started charging a fee to group organizers in early 2005. Initially, changes to the website had to be approved by two committees.  In 2009, Meetup started running hackathons, where employees came up with new features that would be implemented if their coworkers supported it. The website was redesigned in 2013. Meetup had 8 million users in 2010, and 25.5 million users by 2013.

In 2013, Meetup acquired a struggling email collaboration company called Dispatch. In 2014, a hacker shut down Meetup with a DDoS attack, the hacker claimed to be funded by a competitor. In 2017, Meetup created 1,000 #resist Meetup groups in response to the Trump travel ban. This caused some Trump supporters to leave the site or call for a boycott. Meetup also partnered with a labor group to organize anti-Trump protests.

Meetup was acquired by WeWork in late 2017 for about $156 million. Some former employees said there was a 10% layoff after the acquisition. In 2018, Scott Heiferman stepped down as CEO and former Investopedia CEO David Siegel took his place. Heiferman became Chairman of the company. In October 2019, Meetup began to test a different pricing model in two US states, reducing the costs that must be paid by organizers of $23.99/month or $98.94/six months, but requiring users to pay a $2 fee in order to RSVP for events, leaving several users angry. In March 2020, WeWork sold Meetup to AlleyCorp and other investors, reportedly at a substantial loss. The deal added AlleyCorp's Kevin P. Ryan onto Meetup's board.

Services
Meetup is an online service used to create groups that host local in-person and virtual events. As of 2017, there are about 35 million Meetup users. Each user can be a member of multiple groups or RSVP for any number of events. Users are usually using the website to find friends, share a hobby, or for professional networking. Meetup users do not have "followers" or other direct connections with each other like on other social media sites.

Meetup users self-organize into groups. As of 2017, there are about 225,000 Meetup groups in 180 countries. Each group has a different topic, size, and rules. Groups are associated with one of 30+ categories and any number of more than 18,000 tags that identify the group's theme. The most popular categories are "adventure and outdoor activities, career and business, and parents and family." Most events are on a structured schedule each week or month at a local venue, typically on evenings or weekends, though more and more events are being held virtually with a pivot to allowing online events as a reaction to the COVID-19 pandemic. Between March and October 2020, Meetup had hosted more than one million online events.

Meetup groups are run by approximately 140,000 organizers. Any Meetup user can be an organizer. Organizers set up groups, organize events, and develop event content. They also pay a fee to run the group, under the expectation of sharing the cost with members that attend events. Meetup has policies against organizing meetups around a commercial interest that are not compatible with their usage policies, hate speech, or groups that do not meet in-person. Their policy regarding commercial activities has generated some confusion with some claiming that no commercial activities are allowed, even going so far as to claim that a free event that has a sponsor for food and drinks is against Meetup's policies. But purely commercial activities are allowed in their policy, as long as they are, in essence, a Meetup style activity. That is, a winery could organize a wine tasting event through Meetup charging commercial rates, but not use Meetup to simply promote their wines or only sales portal.

References

External links
 Official website

Event management companies of the United States
Social planning websites
Internet-based activism
Internet properties established in 2002
Companies based in New York City
2006 mergers and acquisitions
2017 mergers and acquisitions
WeWork
2020 mergers and acquisitions
Webby Award winners